Kim Hui-hun (born 22 November 1991) is a South Korean gymnast. He competed at the 2012 Summer Olympics and the 2013 World Championships.

References

External links
 

1991 births
Living people
South Korean male artistic gymnasts
Olympic gymnasts of South Korea
Gymnasts at the 2012 Summer Olympics
Gymnasts from Seoul
Asian Games medalists in gymnastics
Gymnasts at the 2010 Asian Games
Gymnasts at the 2014 Asian Games
Asian Games silver medalists for South Korea
Asian Games bronze medalists for South Korea
Medalists at the 2010 Asian Games
Medalists at the 2014 Asian Games
Originators of elements in artistic gymnastics
21st-century South Korean people